Plagiosetum is a genus of plants in the grass family. The only known species is Plagiosetum refractum, found in Queensland, Northern Territory, South Australia, Western Australia, and New South Wales.

References

Panicoideae
Endemic flora of Australia
Monotypic Poaceae genera
Poales of Australia
Taxa named by George Bentham